Dante Ross (born October 11, 1967) is an American music industry executive, artists and repertoire representative, and record producer. He was named one of the top-25 greatest A&R representatives in hip hop by Complex magazine. Ross has been in his career an office messenger, a tour manager, an A&R person, a record producer, a notable songwriter and artist manager.

Early life
Ross was born in San Francisco, California to political activist parents John Ross and mother Norma. He moved to New York City in 1967. Ross was raised by his mother in New York's Lower East Side, then a predominantly Puerto Rican neighborhood, where his mother was a nursery school teacher. Ross spent his teen years skateboarding, writing graffiti and going to see punk rock shows with teenage friends who would eventually become members of the Beastie Boys, the Cro-Mags and Luscious Jackson. As a young man in the early 1980s, he often hung out at the Mudd Club, Danceteria and The Roxy while still in high school. He frequently went to see live music at CBGB where he often saw the Bad Brains who befriended a young Ross. Ross became friends with many notable punk and hardcore groups as well as various future creatives. He credits this along with watching his friends the Beastie Boys success with him wanting to work in the music business.

Career
Ross entered the music business when he was hired as a messenger at the behest of the Beastie Boys and their road manager Sean Carasov at the newly formed Def Jam Recordings. Ross was mentored by Lyor Cohen and Russell Simmons for several years before going to work as an A&R person at Tommy Boy Records, where he signed and handled the careers of such artists as De La Soul, Queen Latifah, and Digital Underground. Ross was then hired by Elektra Records and was the first person ever hired by a major label to be specifically a hip hop A&R man, where he was considered one of the architects of the golden age of hip hop. Ross became the architect of Elektra Records hip hop roster where he signed acts Brand Nubian, Grand Puba, Del the Funky Homosapien, Pete Rock & CL Smooth, KMD, Leaders of the New School, Busta Rhymes and Ol' Dirty Bastard. 

As a producer Ross was a third of the Stimulated Dummies production team with partners John Gamble and Geeby Dajani. The production team worked with artists such as Brand Nubian, Grand Puba, Leaders of the New School, 3rd Bass, and Del the Funky Homosapien. Gamble and Ross later went on to produce sans Dajani: Carlos Santana, Everlast (working on both the multi-platinum album Whitey Ford Sings the Blues and the gold follow-up Eat at Whitey's), and many others. Ross earned a Grammy Award in 2000 for his work on Santana's Supernatural. Ross' production work has also appeared on Eminem's 8 Mile soundtrack, on which he produced and co-wrote two songs that featured Macy Gray and Young Zee. Ross has also been enlisted for his remixing skills, which have been featured on songs by KoЯn as well as a plethora of other artists in genres as diverse as Nu metal, Dancehall, Neo-Soul and Hip-Hop. Ross is credited with championing Macklemore while at Warner Brothers records, which lead him to becoming the VP of A and R at ADA in 2012. He would go on to sign Lil Dicky and MadeinTYO who both were awarded platinum records in 2016. Ugly God, his first signing to the relaunched Asylum Records, was awarded a platinum single in June 2017. He serves as senior vice president of A&R at ADA Music, the independent distribution company owned by the Warner Music Group from 2013-2017. In 2017 Ross served as senior vice president of A&R for the newly re-activated Asylum Records where he signed Sada_Baby before leaving the label in early 2020. Mr. Ross' first book, a memoir titled Son of The City will be published by Rare Bird lit in late May 2023.

!
|-
|align=center|1999
|Supernatural
|Grammy Award for Album of the Year
|
|
|-

References

External links

Wax Poetics 

LTD Magazine 
LA Weekly 

A&R people
1967 births
Living people
Grammy Award winners
Hip hop record producers
Record producers from California
Businesspeople from San Francisco